It Will Never Be Spring or  Wildgroei  is a 1993 Dutch film directed by Frouke Fokkema. The film was screened at the 33rd International Critics' Week of the 1994 Cannes Film Festival.

Cast
Hilde Van Mieghem	... 	Lin Lemmerse
Thom Hoffman	... 	Emile Lombardo
Ellen Ten Damme	... 	Maro
Julien Schoenaerts	... 	Detief
Hans Croiset	... 	Duvekot
Fiet Dekker	... 	Mien
Pim Lambeau	... 	Johanna
Ger Thijs	... 	Casanas
Joop Cramer	... 	Accordeonist op feest
René Eljon	... 	Ober
Henk Kemps	... 	Boris, postbode
Sep Van Kampen	... 	Mooie boerenjongen

References

External links 
 

Dutch drama films
1993 films
1990s Dutch-language films